The Cascade-Sierra province is a physiographic region of mountains in the western United States, east and adjacent to Pacific Border province and west and adjacent to the Basin and Range Province (in the south) and Columbia Plateau Province (in the north).

About the region

The region is extremely diverse geologically and ecologically and is commonly divided into two regions: the Cascade Mountains and the Sierra Nevada Mountains. This province is part of a larger physiographic region that extends from Alaska in the north to the southern tip of South America. Several tectonic plates meet and form this region and make it one of the most geologically active places in North America.

The province is home to several national forests, including the Lassen, Modoc, and Plumas National Forests. The Modoc Plateau, an area of high elevation basalt flows between the Medicine Lake Highlands and the Warner Mountains, is also within the region. The ecology of the province is extremely diverse and contains areas of pine, aspen, and cypress forests, mixed conifer and evergreen forests, along with montane meadows, fens, mammoth granite outcroppings, vernal pools, and sagebrush flats.

Cascade Mountain Range
The Cascade Mountains form the northern portion of the Cascade-Sierra province. The Cascades were created from thousands of small, short-lived volcanoes along the Cascadia subduction zone that over millions of years built a foundation of lava and volcanic debris on which the mountains rise. This range includes thirteen major volcanic centers and are part of the Pacific Ocean's Ring of Fire. The two most recent eruptions are the Mount Lassen eruptions from 1914 to 1921, and the Mount St. Helens eruption in 1980.

Sierra Nevada Mountain Range
The Sierra Nevada Mountains form the southern portion of the Cascade-Sierra province. Like the Cascade Range, the Sierra Nevada Range formed from a chain of volcanoes along a subduction zone. However unlike the Cascade volcanoes, those that formed the Sierra Nevada Range are long extinct and buried deep within the earth forming a bed of solidified lava that is responsible for the gray granitic rocks of the Sierra. One of the best known areas in the Sierra Nevada range is Yosemite National Park.

Further reading
 Hill, M. (1975). Geology of the Sierra Nevada. Berkeley: University of California Press.
 Hill, R. L. (2004). Volcanoes of the Cascades: Their rise and their risks. Guilford, CT: Falcon Press.
 Mathews, D. (2017). Natural History of the Pacific Northwest Mountains. Portland, OR: Timber Press.
 Mooney, H. A., & Zavaleta, E. (2016). Ecosystems of California. Berkeley, California: University of California Press.
 Schoenherr, A. A. (2017). A Natural History of California. Berkeley: University of California Press.
 Tabor, R., & Haugerud, R. (1999). North Cascades National Park Geology: A Mountain Mosiac. Washington D.C.: National Park Service, Geologic Resources Division.

See also
 Fault (geology)
 Geography of California
 Geology of the Yosemite area
 List of United States physiographic regions
 Mountain formation
 Pacific Northwest
 Physiographic regions of the world
 Plate tectonic
 United States physiographic region

References

External links
 Map of the Cascade-Sierra province. United States National Park Service.
 Physiographic Provinces within the United States. United States National Park Service.
 A Tapestry of Time and Terrain: United States physiographic region. United States Geological Survey.

Physiographic sections

 
 

Geologic provinces of California
Geologic provinces of the United States

Mountain ranges of British Columbia
Mountain ranges of Northern California
Mountain ranges of Oregon
Mountain ranges of Nevada
Mountain ranges of Washington (state)

North American Cordillera
Pacific Coast Ranges

Regions of Oregon
Regions of California
Regions of Washington (state)

Volcanism of California